Hours is a 2013 American thriller film directed and written by Eric Heisserer. The film stars Paul Walker, Genesis Rodriguez, TJ Hassan, Shane Jacobsen, and Judd Lormand. The film premiered on March 10, 2013 at the South by Southwest Film Festival in the Topfer Theatre in Austin, Texas. It went on general release on December 13, 2013, two weeks after Paul Walker's death on November 30, 2013.

Plot
In 2005, before Hurricane Katrina strikes New Orleans, Nolan Hayes rushes his wife Abigail Hayes to the emergency room as she is in labor five weeks early. The doctor explains to Nolan that his wife gave birth to a baby girl but lost her life in the process due to liver failure. Nolan refuses to accept her death and is in grief. He then learns that his newborn baby needs to be kept in a ventilator for the next two days before she can breathe on her own. The only problem is that the hurricane is beginning to flood the hospital and the ventilator can't be moved.

When the hurricane becomes too strong, everyone in the hospital, including the doctors and nurses, evacuate the building, leaving only Nolan and his baby (whom he names Abigail, after her mother) in the empty hospital. One of the nurses promises to bring back help and leaves, because Nolan is unwilling to abandon his baby. The power then goes out and Nolan is forced to find a way to keep his baby alive. He finds a hand-cranked generator in a storeroom and is able to manually charge the ventilator battery, but it only holds a charge for three minutes. He also finds some more IVs for the baby to keep her nourished, and some food and drinks for him to stay alive as well. With each charge the battery life gets shorter. Using only that amount of time, Nolan tries to juggle trying to get help outside of the hospital and rushing to help his baby before her timer runs out. Sometimes, Nolan sits down with his baby and tells the story about how he met her mother, to help keep himself preoccupied. (The two met after stopping a bank robbery together.)

After this, Nolan finds a stray dog hiding in the hospital and takes care of it. He names the dog Sherlock while also having illusions of talking with his late wife. Nolan goes to the rooftop to find helicopters flying around the building. When he tries to signal one, criminals distract it by shooting at it, demanding to be rescued first. This leaves Nolan furious, but he has to return to his daughter to charge the battery before he can do more. Nolan manages to also find an ambulance on a flooded street outside. He calls for help using the ambulance's radio, but can't wait for a reply when he has to return to the room to charge the battery.

Nolan attempts to find a spare battery, but has no luck. After running back upstairs and charging the battery, he returns and finds a generator in a flooded basement room, but it is ruined from water, and almost electrocutes him. Nolan barely returns to the room in time to charge the battery again. Despite being awake for over 36 hours without power and running low on food, (his hand cut from cranking the generator), Nolan continues to come up with more clever ways to charge the battery (i.e. using his foot and later a rod). He also plays games with Sherlock, like playing fetch with him and sharing his lunch meat given to him by one of the hospital cooks.

Looters soon start to break into the hospital and steal food, drug and saline water for the baby. One comes in Nolan's room and tries to steal food but gets attacked by Sherlock, who runs him off. Nolan later realizes that this man had robbed and killed the nurse who was bringing back supplies (as she promised earlier). Since he hasn't slept in almost two days, Nolan takes a shot of some adrenaline to keep himself awake. Two more looters later break in the hospital and try to steal drugs to get high with and sell. When Nolan finds that they are both armed with guns, Nolan takes two shots of the adrenaline and sneaks up on one, injecting him with it and giving him a fatal overdose. Nolan takes his Marlin 336 lever-action rifle and surprises the other thug, who has discovered his baby. Nolan shakes his head "no" while holding the rifle on him, trying to get him to leave them alone. However, the man tries to shoot Nolan in revenge so Nolan shoots him in the head, vowing to his daughter that he will let no one hurt her.

Nolan is now so exhausted he cannot crank it with his hand any longer. Nolan has to use both his hands to slowly crank the handle, but breaks it off accidentally. Nolan's attempts to fix the crank generator fails, so he gives his child mouth-to-mouth resuscitation to keep her alive. Before he can do any more, Nolan passes out from shock, stress, and exhaustion. Nolan then hears the ventilator beeping; it is running out of power. However, he is too weak to get back up. Nolan accepts that he has failed his child. But Sherlock comes to his aid and brings two paramedics with him to save Nolan, and drag him out. When Nolan wakes up, the paramedics hear his baby crying and run off to find her. Abigail has finally learned to breathe on her own. The paramedics give Nolan his baby and the two embrace, with Nolan crying tears of joy as they are brought to safety.

Cast
 Paul Walker as Nolan Hayes
 Genesis Rodriguez as Abigail Hayes
 TJ Hassan as Jeremy
 Shane Jacobsen as Marc
 Judd Lormand as Glenn
 Nancy Nave as Sandra
 Michelle Torres as Hurricane Katrina victim
 Kerry Cahill as Nurse Shelly
 Yohance Myles as Dr. Edmonds
 Natalia Safran as Karen
 Elton LeBlanc as Paramedic
 Tony Bentley as Doctor
 Emily D. Haley as Patient
 Christopher Matthew Cook as Lenny
 Cynthia LeBlanc as Head Nurse
 Lena Clark as Lucy

Reception

On Rotten Tomatoes, a review aggregator, the film holds an approval rating of 61% with an average rating of 5.05/10, based on 33 reviews. On Metacritic, the film has a weighted average score of 55 out of 100, based on 16 critics, indicating "mixed or average reviews".

Variety film critic Joe Leydon wrote that Hours "ingeniously simple setup is cunningly exploited for maximum suspense."

References

External links

2013 films
2013 thriller drama films
American thriller drama films
2013 directorial debut films
Films set in 2005
Films set in New Orleans
Films shot in New Orleans
Films scored by Benjamin Wallfisch
Films about Hurricane Katrina
Films about tropical cyclones
Films set in hospitals
Films produced by Peter Safran
2013 drama films
2010s English-language films
2010s American films